William Simpson Aston (29 March 1900 – 4 March 1974) was a British racing driver who participated in three World Championship Grands Prix, in 1952 when the championship was run to Formula Two rules, for his own team Aston Butterworth.

Career
Prior to taking part in World Championship Grand Prix racing, Aston was a test pilot and motorcycle racer. He turned to four-wheel racing with a Cooper-JAP in Formula Three and later graduated into Formula Two. He came close to winning a heat race at Chimay in 1951, driving an  Cooper, but his car failed on the last lap. In the same year he set a  world speed record at Montlhéry in the streamlined Cooper, fitted with a V-twin J.A.P. motor.

For 1952 he teamed up with Archie Butterworth to build the Aston Butterworth, a car that raced quite well, but was unfortunately very unreliable. He entered the car in the British Grand Prix and qualified 30th and last. However, he was unable to start the race. He then entered the 1952 German Grand Prix, but his car failed on the second lap. At the Italian Grand Prix he failed to make it through qualifying. Aston raced on into his 60s, with a Mini and a Jaguar, before he retired.

Racing record

Complete Formula One World Championship results
(key)

Complete British Saloon Car Championship results
(key) (Races in bold indicate pole position; races in italics indicate fastest lap.)

† Events with 2 races staged for the different classes.

 Car over 1000cc - Not eligible for points.

See also
Robin Montgomerie-Charrington

References

External links 
Bill Aston profile at The 500 Owners Association

English racing drivers
English Formula One drivers
Aston Butterworth Formula One drivers
1900 births
1974 deaths
Sportspeople from Stafford
British Touring Car Championship drivers